International Festival Entr'2 marches (Between 2 steps) in Cannes is a festival of short movies, less than 26 minutes, and with (French) subtitles. The subject of these movies is about people with disabilities. This festival is organized by the French Association for the Paralyzed: APF. It takes place during the Cannes Film Festival.

Presentation 

Sagor Hossain 26-April-1997 lyrics, tuner, singer, video arranger, musical video director, scrip writer

Previous Record

International Festival Entr'2 marches 2014 
Awarded movies :

Grand Prix du Jury : Sunny Boy, Jane Gull (11 min)
Public Price (Georges Lautner) : Le problèms c’est que…, Wilfrid Meance(9 min)
Coup de cœur Price : Nous sommes tous des êtres penchés, Simon Lelouch (26 min)
Best documentary : La mécanique du silence, Brigitte Lemaine (20 min)
Best Director : J’en crois pas mes yeux, Henri Poulain (8 min)
Best Script : Larmes de fond, Philippe Lecoq (20 min)
Best Actress : Marianne Fabbro in Chichis, glaces, beignets, Marjolaine de Lecluse (14 min)
Best Actor : Oto Baxter Ups and Downs, Stuart Fryer (9 min)
Youth Price : Regarde-moi, Olivier Marchal (13 min)

International Festival Entr'2 marches 2017 
Awarded movies :
Prix du Jury : Love is Blind, Odai Al Mukdad, Arsi Nami, April Lam (5.45 min)
Prix L'interpretation: Connor Long, as Michael in "Learning to Drive" shortfilm, United States

All films were subtitled in French.

International Festival Entr'2 marches 2019 

 Prix Entr'2 Marches : « Miss Hong » de Jong Ki Jeon (Corée - 7 min)
 Prix du Jury : « TEA » de Shokir Kholikov (Ouzbékistan - 15 min)
 Prix de la Réalisation : Javad Daraei pour « Limit » (Iran - 7 min)
 Prix d'Interprétation : Annie Cordy pour « Les Jouvencelles » de Delphine Corrard (France - 20 min)
 Prix du Documentaire : « La Faim des Fous » de Franck Seuret (France - 53 min)
 Prix Très Spécial du Jury : « Te Necesito Ya » de Cremance (Mexique - 53 min)
 Prix du Public Georges Lautner : « Mon Frère ce héros » de Yonatan Nir (Israël - 1h18)
 Prix de la Jeunesse : « Les Jouvencelles » de Delphine Corrard (France - 20 min)

References

External links 

Facebook page of Festival
Website of AFP : French Association for Paralyzed

Film festivals in France
Short film festivals